Pizzo Marumo is a mountain of the Lepontine Alps, overlooking the Greina Pass in Switzerland. It is located in the canton of Ticino, near the border with the canton of Graubünden.

References

External links
 Pizzo Marumo on Hikr

Mountains of the Alps
Mountains of Switzerland
Mountains of Ticino
Lepontine Alps